Steinheil is a surname. Notable people with the surname include:

 Adolph Steinheil (1810–1839), German botanist 
 Heinrich Steinhowel ( "Steinhöwel" "Steinhauel", "Steinheil"; 1412, Weil – 1482, Ulm), a Swabian author, humanist, and translator
 Count Fabian (Gotthard von) Steinheil ( Faddej F. Štejngel'; 1762, in the Kreis Hapsal - 1831), an Estonia-born Baltic-German nobleman
 Carl August von Steinheil (1801, Ribeauvillé, Alsace – 1870), Alsatian-German physicist
 Eduard Wilhelm Steinheil (1830, Munich – 1879, Colombia), German entomologist and engineer
 (Édouard Charles) Adolphe Steinheil (1850, Paris – 1908, Paris), a French painter
 Marguerite "Meg" (Jeanne) Steinheil, Lady (ée) Abinger (1869, Beaucourt – 1954), French woman, married with Adolph

See also
 Steinheil (crater), named after Carl August von Steinheil
 C. A. Steinheil & Söhne, company, manufacturer of cameras, lenses and photographic equipment in Germany

References 

German-language surnames